The 1995–96 EHF Women's Champions League was the third edition of the modern era of the 1961-founded competition for European national champions women's handball clubs, running from 7 October 1995 to 11 May 1996. Podravka Koprivnica defeated Hypo Niederösterreich in a rematch of the previous edition's final to become the first Croatian club to win the competition, ending the Austrians four-years winning streak.

Round of 32

Round of 16

Group stage

Group A

Group B

Final

References

Women's EHF Champions League
Ehf Women's Champions League, 1995-96
Ehf Women's Champions League, 1995-96
EHF
EHF